Prezioso is an Italian surname. Notable people with the surname include:

Giovanni Prezioso (born 1957), American lawyer
Mario Prezioso (born 1996), Italian footballer
Roman Prezioso (born 1949), American politician

See also
Prezioso & Marvin

Italian-language surnames